The Ōpihi River flows through south Canterbury, in New Zealand's South Island.  It has been identified as an Important Bird Area by BirdLife International because it supports breeding colonies of the endangered black-billed gull.

Description
The town of Fairlie lies on the river's banks.

History
The banks of the river around the settlement of Waitohi were the site of some of the first flights by pioneer aviator Richard Pearse.

Chinook salmon (Oncorhynchus tshawytscha) were introduced from California in the 1900s and persist today.

In 2000, Environment Canterbury approved the Opihi River Regional Plan for sustainable management of the resources of the river.

References

Rivers of Canterbury, New Zealand
Important Bird Areas of New Zealand
Rivers of New Zealand